The Zárate–Brazo Largo Bridges are two cable-stayed road and railway bridges in Argentina, crossing the Paraná River (Paraná Guazú and Paraná de las Palmas) between the cities of Zárate,  Buenos Aires Province, and Brazo Largo, Entre Ríos Province.

They were built between 1972 and 1977 on a design by Italian engineer Fabrizio de Miranda, and refurbished in 1998.

Zárate–Brazo Largo links the north of Buenos Aires with the southern part of the Argentine Mesopotamia, and also, by extension, Argentina with Uruguay and Brazil. The road link has four lanes.

The bridge over the Parana de las Palmas is called "Bartolomé Mitre", while bridge over the Parana Guazú is called "Justo José de Urquiza".

References
(it) Baglietto E., Casirati M., Castoldi A., De Miranda F., Sammartino R., 1976, Ponti Zarate–Brazo Largo: modelli matematici e strutturali del comportamento statico e dinamico, in "Costruzioni Metalliche", 4/1976.
 (it) De Miranda F., 1980, I ponti strallati di grande luce, Zanichelli Bologna (I), pp. 231–246.

External links
  ZarateGlobal.com.ar - Zárate city portal.
 Bridge over the Rio Paranà in Las Palmas.
  Crossing the Zarate–Brazo Largo Bridge.
 flickr photo
Co-ordinates:
General Mitre Bridge: 
General Urquiza Bridge: 

Cable-stayed bridges in Argentina
Buildings and structures in Buenos Aires Province
Buildings and structures in Entre Ríos Province
Bridges completed in 1978
Bridges over the Paraná River